The Sheriff of Aberdeen was a royal official who was responsible for enforcing justice in Aberdeenshire, Scotland. Prior to 1748 most sheriffdoms were held on a hereditary basis. From that date, following the Jacobite uprising of 1745, they were replaced by salaried sheriff-deputes, qualified advocates who were members of the Scottish Bar.

In 1870 the sheriffdom was merged with that of Kincardineshire to create the post of Sheriff of Aberdeen and Kincardine. The combined sheriffdom then absorbed Banffshire in 1882 to create the  post of Sheriff of Aberdeen, Kincardine and Banff.

This sheriffdom was abolished in 1975 and replaced by the current Sheriffdom of Grampian, Highland and Islands.

Sheriffs of Aberdeen

Philip de Melville, 1221
William Prat, 1246
Gregory de Melville, before 1263
Andrew of Garioch, 1264
William de Meldrum, 1290
Henry de Latham,  1297
John of Strathbogie, Earl of Atholl, 1299–1300
Alexander Comyn, 1303
Robert II Keith, Marischal of Scotland, 1304–1305
Alexander Comyn, 1305
Norman Leslie, 1305
Walter de Barclay, 1320–1324
John Drimmmyng, 1325
John Brown, 1328
Robert III Keith, Marischal of Scotland, 1335
John de Bonneville, 1337
Andrew Fraser of Ewnysedale, 1342
Robert III Keith, Marischal of Scotland, 1342-1343
Alexander Fraser of Ewynesdale, 1343
William de Meldrum, 1347–1358
Phillip Dumbeck - 1348 - Deputy
William de Lidell, 1358
Walter Maule, 1364
Alexander Fraser of Philorth, 1369–1399
Phillip Dumbeck - 1369 - Deputy
John Forbes, 1373
Patrick of Crawford, 1381
Thomas Norrie - 1389 - Deputy 
John Fraser of Forglen, 1382
Alexander Fraser, 1391
David Lindsay, 1st Earl of Crawford, 1400–1408
Walter Lindsay of Kinneff, 1417–1423
Alexander Lindsay, 2nd Earl of Crawford, 1421–1439
David Lindsay, 3rd Earl of Crawford, 1439–1445
Alexander Forbes - 1440 - Deputy
Alexander Lindsay, 4th Earl of Crawford, 1445–1453
Alexander Gordon, 1st Earl of Huntly, 1453
Alexander Douglas- 1454 - Deputy
Walter Lindsay of Kinblathmont, 1457
Walter Lindsay of Bewford - 1459 - Deputy
David Lindsay, 1st Duke of Montrose, 1461–1495
John Ogston - 1467-1469 - Deputy
Alexander Irvine of Drum - 1469 - Deputy
Alexander Lindsay, Master of Crawford, 1474
Alexander Bannerman - 1498 - Deputy
John Lindsay, 6th Earl of Crawford
William Hay, 4th Earl of Erroll (died 1513)
William Hay, 5th Earl of Erroll (died 1522)
William Hay, 6th Earl of Erroll (died 1541)
Alexander Gordon, 3rd Earl of Huntly (died 1524)
Alexander Ogilvy of that ilk
James Stewart, Earl of Moray
David Lindsay, 8th Earl of Crawford
George Gordon, 4th Earl of Huntly (died 1562)
William Leslie, 9th of Balquhain
George Gordon, 5th Earl of Huntly (died 1576)
John Leslie, 10th of Balquhain
George Gordon, 1st Marquess of Huntly, -1630
Sir George Johnston of that ilk, 1630–1631
Sir Alexander Irvine of Drum, 1634–
Alexander Forbes, 1st Lord Forbes of Pitsligo (died 1636)
Sir Thomas Crombie of Kemnay
Sir William Forbes of Craigievar
William Keith, 7th Earl Marischal
William Forbes, 11th Lord Forbes (died 1697)

Sheriffs-depute
William Forbes, 1728- 
Alexander Grant of Grantsfield 1741–  
David Dalrymple, Lord Westhall, 1748–1777
Alexander Elphinstone of Glack, 1777–1795 
Alexander Moir, 1795-1822 
Andrew Murray, 1822-1847 
John Thomson Gordon, 1847–1848  (Sheriff of Edinburgh, 1848-)
Archibald Davidson, 1848–1865  (Sheriff of Edinburgh, 1865–)
Andrew Jameson, 1865–1870

Sheriffs of Aberdeen and Kincardine (1870)
Andrew Jameson, 1865–1870 
John Guthrie Smith, 1870–1882

Sheriffs of Aberdeen and Kincardine and Banff (1882)
John Guthrie Smith, 1882–1895
Donald Crawford, 1895–1911  
John Campbell Lorimer, 1911–1920 
Alexander Logan McClure, 1920–1932 
(Sir) George Morton, 1932–1953 
James Walker, 1953–54 
Thomas Pringle McDonald, 1954–1969 
 Interim appointment of Sheriff F.W.F. O'Brien, 1969–1971 
Alexander Mackenzie Stuart, Baron Mackenzie-Stuart, 1971–1972 
George Stanley Gimson, 1972–1975  (Sheriff Principal of Grampian, Highland and Islands, 1975-1982) 

Sheriffdom abolished in 1975 and replaced by the sheriffdom of Grampian, Highland and Islands.

See also
 Historical development of Scottish sheriffdoms

References

Records of the Sheriff court of Aberdeenshire, ed. Littlejohn, D., Aberdeen 1904. pp.393-430

Aberdeen